The Republic of China Food and Drug Administration (FDA) is a Republic of China government agency, which is responsible for the safety and quality of food, drug, medical service and cosmetics. It is part of the Ministry of Health and Welfare. FDA is a regulatory member of ICH association.

History
On 3 June 2009, the Republic of China Food and Drug Administration Organization Act was promulgated. On 1 January 2010, the consolation of Bureau of Food Safety, Bureau of Pharmaceutical Affairs, Bureau of Food and Drug Analysis and Bureau of Controlled Drugs to form the Republic of China Food and Drug Administration were completed. On 23 July 2013, it was placed under the Ministry of Health and Welfare.

Organizational structures

Operational divisions
 Planning and research development
 Food safety
 Medicinal products
 Medical devices and cosmetics
 Controlled drugs
 Research and analysis
 Risk management

Administrative office
 Secretariat
 Personnel
 Accounting
 Service ethics
 Information management

References

External links 

 

2010 establishments in Taiwan
Executive Yuan
Food safety organizations
National agencies for drug regulation
Regulation in Taiwan